Nganjuk Station (station code: NJ) is a first-class railway station in Mangundikaran, Nganjuk, Nganjuk Regency, East Java, Indonesia, operated by Kereta Api Indonesia. This railway station is located on  Panglima Sudirman Road, at the city centre of Nganjuk. Although located in capital of Nganjuk, this railway station building is smaller than Kertosono railway station, the major station and terminus of Solo Balapan–Kertosono railway.

Services

Passenger services

Executive class
 Bima, destination of  via  and 
 Gajayana, destination of  via  and 
 Brawijaya, destination of  via  and

Mixed class
 Brantas, destination of  via  and 
 Ranggajati, destination of  via  and  via 

Economy class
 Majapahit, destination of  via  and 
 Jayakarta, destination of  via  and 
 Matarmaja, destination of  via  and 

Freight services
  via --
  via --

References

External links 

 Kereta Api Indonesia - Indonesian railway company's official website

Nganjuk Regency
Railway stations in East Java